The Okeechobee Group is a geologic group in Florida. The group preserves fossils dating back to the Neogene period. This group of formations in the Everglades were deposited when high tropical water started to return in the Late Zanclean Period.

See also

 List of fossiliferous stratigraphic units in Florida

References

 

Geologic groups of Florida